Limonium binervosum, commonly known as rock sea-lavender, is an aggregate species in the family Plumbaginaceae.

Despite the common name, rock sea-lavender is not related to the lavenders or to rosemary but is a perennial herb with small violet-blue flowers with five petals in clusters.

Eight rock sea-lavenders are endemic to Britain and Guernsey and the taxonomy was reviewed in 1986 to include a range of subspecies.

Growing 10–70 cm tall from a rhizome, Limonium binervosum flourishes in saline soils, so are therefore common near  the western coasts and in salt marshes, and also on saline, gypsum and alkaline soils such as found on Flat Holm island in Wales, UK

Subspecies

 Limonium binervosum subsp. anglicum
 Limonium binervosum subsp. cantianum
 Limonium binervosum subsp. saxonicum
 Limonium britanicum subsp. britanicum
 Limonium britanicum subsp. combense
 Limonium binervosum subsp. pseudotranswallianum 
 Limonium dodartiforme
 Limonium loganicum
 Limonium recurvum

References

External links
 List of UK endemic plants
 Description of Limonium binoversum
 UK biodiversity action plan for Limonium binoversum
  Grid map of records on the Gateway for Limonium binervosum
 Rock sea lavenders in Ireland

binervosum
Halophytes
Flora of Great Britain